The 2013–14 Club Brugge K.V. season was the club's 111th season since establishment in 1891. They competed in the Belgian Pro League, the Belgian Cup as well as the UEFA Europa League.

Season summary

Players

First-team squad

Reserve squad

Transfers in

Transfers out

Results

Belgian Pro League

Regular season

Championship playoff

Belgian Cup

UEFA Europa League

Third qualifying round

References

External links
Club website

Club Brugge KV seasons
Club Brugge